Forever Young is an American reality television series that premiered on TV Land on April 3, 2013 from Ashton Kutcher and Jason Goldberg's Katalyst (Punk'd, True Beauty), and 3 Ball Productions headed by executive producers J. D. Roth and Todd A. Nelson (The Biggest Loser, MasterChef).

Premise
This reality series puts ten people in a house, where they live together with cameras capturing their every move. The twist is that the housemates are split into two groups – juniors and seniors – based on their age. The juniors are all under the age of 30 and the seniors are over 70. They are assigned various tasks meant to help them overcome the generation gap and form bonds. Through the challenges, which include teaching the seniors how to play beer pong and showing the juniors how to use a paper map, the groups hope to surmount their differences and become friends.

Episodes

References

2010s American reality television series
2013 American television series debuts
2013 American television series endings
English-language television shows
TV Land original programming